Killdergen Creek is a stream in northeast Lincoln and southeast Pike counties in the U.S. state of Missouri. It is a tributary of Guinns Creek which it meets just northwest of the community of Sledd.

Killdergen Creek has the name of a pioneer citizen.

See also
List of rivers of Missouri

References

Rivers of Lincoln County, Missouri
Rivers of Pike County, Missouri
Rivers of Missouri